Beginning in 2017, president Donald Trump and his allies alleged that the FBI's Crossfire Hurricane investigation (that found myriad improper links between Trump associates and Russian officials and led to the Mueller investigation) was part of deep state plot and a "hoax" or "witch hunt" that was baselessly initiated by his political enemies. In April 2019, Attorney General William Barr announced that he had launched a review of the origins of the FBI's investigation into Russian interference in the 2016 United States elections, and it was reported in May that he had assigned longtime federal prosecutor John Durham to lead it several weeks earlier. Durham was given the authority "to broadly examin[e] the government's collection of intelligence involving the Trump campaign's interactions with Russians," reviewing government documents and requesting voluntary witness statements. In December 2020, Barr revealed to Congress that on October 19 he had secretly appointed Durham special counsel, allowing him to continue the investigation after the Trump administration ended. 

Durham's investigation was predicated on an unproven conspiracy theory pushed by Trump that "the Russia investigation likely stemmed from a conspiracy by intelligence or law enforcement agencies". When Inspector General Michael Horowitz disproved that theory by testifying to Congress that the FBI showed no political bias at the initiation of the investigation into Trump and possible connections with Russia, Barr and Durham, in the words of a New York Times report, "turned to a new rationale: a hunt for a basis to accuse the Clinton campaign of conspiring to defraud the government by manufacturing the suspicions that the Trump campaign had colluded with Russia, along with scrutinizing what the F.B.I. and intelligence officials knew about the Clinton campaign's actions."

After 3½ years, Durham indicted three men, one of whom pleaded guilty to a charge unrelated to the origins of the FBI investigation, and was sentenced to probation; the other two men were tried and acquitted. In both trials, Durham alleged the defendants had deceived the FBI, rather than alleging the FBI acted improperly toward Trump. After nearly four years, Durham's investigation has not uncovered "anything like the deep state plot alleged by Mr. Trump and suspected by Mr. Barr".

Investigation into origins of FBI investigation "Crossfire Hurricane"

On October 24, 2019, it was reported that what had been a review of the Russia investigation was now a criminal probe into the matter. The Justice Department could now utilize subpoena power for both witness testimony and documents. Durham also had at his disposal the power to convene a grand jury and file criminal charges, if needed. The New York Times reported in January 2023 that Durham and Barr, contrary to their better knowledge, allowed the media and public to infer that it was crimes committed by the intelligence community against Trump that were the object of this investigation. Instead, Italian authorities had given them evidence of alleged financial crimes by Trump himself: "Mr. Barr and Mr. Durham never disclosed that their inquiry expanded in the fall of 2019, based on a tip from Italian officials, to include a criminal investigation into suspicious financial dealings related to Mr. Trump." Durham never charged Trump.

The New York Times reported on November 22, 2019 that the Justice Department inspector general had made a criminal referral to Durham regarding Kevin Clinesmith, an FBI attorney who had altered an email during the process of acquiring a wiretap warrant renewal on Carter Page, and that referral appeared to be at least part of the reason Durham's investigation was elevated to criminal status. On August 14, 2020, Clinesmith pleaded guilty to a felony violation of altering an email used to maintain Foreign Intelligence Surveillance Act (FISA) warrants. He changed an email to falsely add a claim that Page was "not a source" for the CIA, to a statement by the CIA liaison that Page had a prior operational relationship with the CIA from 2008 to 2013. The Page warrants began in October 2016, months after the FBI's Crossfire Hurricane investigation was opened, so Clinesmith's action and indictment were unrelated to the original basis of Durham's investigation into the origins of the FBI investigation. 

The day Justice Department inspector general Michael Horowitz released his report on the 2016 FBI Crossfire Hurricane investigation, which found the investigation was properly predicated and debunked a number of conspiracy theories regarding its origins, Durham issued a statement saying, "we do not agree with some of the report’s conclusions as to predication and how the FBI case was opened." Many observers inside and outside the Justice Department, including the inspector general, expressed surprise that Durham would issue such a statement, as federal investigators typically do not publicly comment on their ongoing investigations. Barr also released a statement challenging the findings of the report, later asserting on Fox News that the investigation had been opened "without any basis" and that "what happened to [Trump] was one of the greatest travesties in American history." Horowitz testified to the Senate that prior to release of the report he had asked Durham for any information he had that might change the report's findings, but "none of the discussions changed our findings." The Washington Post reported that Durham could not provide evidence of any setup by American intelligence. In particular, neither Durham nor Horowitz found cause to believe an allegation by former Trump campaign advisor George Papadopoulos—whose actions had triggered the opening of Crossfire Hurricane—that he had been set up by Maltese professor Joseph Mifsud, whom Papadopoulos alleged was a Western intelligence operative. Mifsud was an Italian resident, and Barr and Durham asked Italian officials about him during a trip to Italy, but the officials said they had no involvement in the matter. Mifsud has been claimed to be an intelligence agent by various sources. Former FBI Director James Comey has described Mifsud as a "Russian agent".

The New York Times reported in December 2019 that Durham was examining the role of former CIA director John Brennan in assessing Russian interference in 2016, requesting emails, call logs and other documents. Brennan had been a vocal critic of Trump and a target of his accusations of a conspiracy against him. The Times reported Durham was specifically examining Brennan's views of the Steele dossier and what he said about it to the FBI and other intelligence agencies. Brennan and former Director of National Intelligence James Clapper had testified to Congress that the CIA and other intelligence agencies did not rely on the dossier in preparing the January 2017 intelligence community assessment of Russian interference, and allies of Brennan said he disagreed with the FBI view that the dossier should be given significant weight, as the CIA characterized it as "internet rumor". The Times reported in February 2020 that Durham was examining whether intelligence community officials, and specifically Brennan, had concealed or manipulated evidence of Russian interference to achieve a desired result. FBI and NSA officials told Durham that his pursuit of this line of inquiry was due to his misunderstanding of how the intelligence community functions. Durham interviewed Brennan for eight hours on August 21, 2020, after which a Brennan advisor said Durham told Brennan he was not a subject or target of a criminal investigation, but rather a witness to events.

The New York Times reported in September 2020 that Durham had also sought documents and interviews regarding how the FBI handled an investigation into the Clinton Foundation. The FBI had investigated the Foundation and other matters related to Hillary Clinton, but had found no basis for prosecution, nor did John Huber, a U.S. attorney appointed by Trump's first attorney general Jeff Sessions, after a two-year investigation ending in January 2020.

On November 2, 2020, the day before the presidential election, New York magazine reported that:

As Durham was winding down his investigation in January 2023, The New York Times observed:
But after almost four years — far longer than the Russia investigation itself — Mr. Durham’s work is coming to an end without uncovering anything like the deep state plot alleged by Mr. Trump and suspected by Mr. Barr. Moreover, a monthslong review by The New York Times found that the main thrust of the Durham inquiry was marked by some of the very same flaws — including a strained justification for opening it and its role in fueling partisan conspiracy theories that would never be charged in court — that Trump allies claim characterized the Russia investigation.

Conviction of FBI attorney Kevin Clinesmith 
On October 24, 2019, The New York Times and The Washington Post reported that Durham's inquiry had been elevated to a criminal investigation, raising concerns of politicization of the Justice Department to pursue political enemies of the President. The Times reported on November 22 that the Justice Department inspector general had made a criminal referral to Durham regarding Kevin Clinesmith, a low-level FBI attorney assigned to the Mueller probe who had resigned in February 2018. Clinesmith was accused of altering an email during the process of renewing a Foreign Intelligence Surveillance Act (FISA) wiretap warrant against former Trump campaign advisor Carter Page. Clinesmith pleaded guilty to a felony violation in August 2020 for adding the phrase "and not a source" to a statement by a CIA liaison saying that Carter Page had a prior "contact" relationship with the CIA from 2008 to 2013. On January 29, 2021, Clinesmith was sentenced to 12 months federal probation and 400 hours of community service. The judge stated that Clinesmith "likely believed that what he said about Mr. Page was true" and that he had taken "an inappropriate shortcut." He also said the IG inspection did not establish that "political considerations played a role in Clinesmith's actions."

Acquittal of Michael Sussmann 

On September 16, 2021, Durham indicted Michael Sussmann, a partner for the law firm Perkins Coie, alleging he falsely told FBI general counsel James Baker during a September 2016 meeting that he was not representing a client for their discussion. Durham alleged Sussmann was actually representing "a U.S. Technology Industry Executive, a U.S. Internet Company and the Hillary Clinton Presidential Campaign." Sussmann focuses on  privacy and cybersecurity law and had approached Baker to discuss what he and others believed to be suspicious communications between computer servers at the Russian Alfa-Bank and the Trump Organization. Sussmann had represented the Democratic National Committee regarding the Russian hacking of its computer network. Sussmann's attorneys have denied he was representing the Clinton campaign. Perkins Coie represented the Clinton presidential campaign, and one of its partners, Marc Elias, commissioned Fusion GPS to conduct opposition research on Trump, which led to the production of the Steele dossier. Sussmann, a former federal prosecutor, characterized the allegations against him as politically motivated and pleaded not guilty the day after his indictment. As with the charge against Clinesmith, the charge against Sussmann was unrelated to the FBI investigation into links between Trump associates and Russian officials, which began in July 2016. Rather than asserting the FBI engaged in wrongdoing, as long alleged by Trump and resulting in Durham's investigation, the Sussmann indictment portrays the bureau as a victim of wrongdoing.

During a 2018 congressional deposition, Baker stated, "I don’t remember [Sussmann] specifically saying that he was acting on behalf of a particular client," though the Durham investigation found handwritten notes taken by Assistant Director of the FBI Counterintelligence Division Bill Priestap which paraphrase Baker telling him after the meeting that Sussmann "said not doing this for any client." The notes also say "Represents DNC, Clinton Foundation, etc.," though they did not say Sussmann told Baker this during the meeting; Baker had also said during his deposition that he was generally familiar with Sussmann's work, as they were friends. The Priestap notes constitute hearsay and it was not clear if they would be admissible in court as evidence under the hearsay rule.

The New York Times reported Durham had records showing Sussmann had billed the Clinton campaign for certain hours he spent working on the Alfa-Bank matter. His attorneys said he did so because he needed to demonstrate internally that he was engaged in billable work, though the work involved consulting with Elias, and the campaign paid a flat monthly fee to Perkins Coie but was not actually charged for those billed hours.

In a December 2021 court filing, Sussmann's attorneys presented portions of two documents provided to them by Durham days earlier which they asserted undermined the indictment. One document was a summary of an interview Durham's investigators conducted with Baker in June 2020 in which he did not say that Sussmann told him he was not there on behalf of any client, but rather that Baker had assumed it and that the issue never came up. A second document was a June 2019 Justice Department inspector general interview with Baker in which he said the Sussmann meeting "related to strange interactions that some number of people that were his clients, who were, he described as I recall it, sort of cybersecurity experts, had found." The New York Times reported that the narrow charge against Sussmann was contained in a 27-page indictment that elaborated on activities of cybersecurity researchers who were not charged, including what their attorneys asserted were selected email excerpts that falsely portrayed them as not actually believing their claims. Trump and his supporters seized on that information to assert the Alfa-Bank matter was a hoax devised by Clinton supporters and so the Trump-Russia investigation had been unjustified. Sussmann's attorneys told the court that the new evidence "underscores the baseless and unprecedented nature of this indictment" and asked that his trial date be moved from July to May 2022. A Durham prosecutor later asserted that subsequent to his 2019 and 2020 interviews, Baker "affirmed and then re-affirmed his now-clear recollection of the defendant’s false statement" after refreshing his memory with contemporaneous or near-contemporaneous notes.

In a February 2022 court motion related to Sussmann's prosecution, Durham alleged that Sussmann associate Rodney Joffe and his associates had "exploited" capabilities his company had through a pending cybersecurity contract with the Executive Office of the President (EOP) to acquire nonpublic government Domain Name System (DNS) and other data traffic "for the purpose of gathering derogatory information about Donald Trump." Joffe was not charged and his attorney did not immediately comment. After Sussmann's September 2021 indictment, The New York Times reported that in addition to analyzing suspicious communications involving a Trump server, Sussmann and analysts he worked with became aware of data from a YotaPhone — a Russian-made smartphone rarely used in the United States — that had accessed networks serving the White House, Trump Tower and a Michigan hospital company, Spectrum Health. Like the Alfa-Bank server, a Spectrum Health server also communicated with the Trump Organization server. Sussmann notified CIA counterintelligence of the findings in February 2017, but it was not known if they were investigated. Durham alleged in his February 2022 court motion that Sussmann had claimed his information "demonstrated that Trump and/or his associates were using supposedly rare, Russian-made wireless phones in the vicinity of the White House and other locations," but Durham said he found no evidence to support that. Sussmann's attorneys  responded that Durham knew Sussmann had not made such a claim to the CIA. Durham alleged Sussmann's data showed a Russian phone provider connection involving the EOP "during the Obama administration and years before Trump took office." Attorneys for an analyst who examined the YotaPhone data said researchers were investigating malware in the White House; a spokesman for Joffe said his client had lawful access under a contract to analyze White House DNS data for potential security threats. The spokesman asserted Joffe's work was in response to hacks of the EOP in 2015 and of the DNC in 2016, as well as YotaPhone queries in proximity to the EOP and the Trump campaign, that raised "serious and legitimate national security concerns about Russian attempts to infiltrate the 2016 election" that was shared with the CIA. Durham asserted that Sussmann bringing his information to the CIA was part of a broader effort to raise the intelligence community's suspicions of Trump's connections to Russia shortly after he took office. Durham did not allege that any eavesdropping of Trump communications content occurred, nor did he assert the Clinton campaign was involved or that the alleged DNS monitoring activity was unlawful or occurred after Trump took office.

Durham's filing triggered a furor among right-wing media outlets, including misinformation about what Durham had alleged, which was challenged by other outlets and lawyers for the involved parties. Fox News falsely reported that Durham claimed Hillary Clinton's campaign had paid a technology company to "infiltrate" White House and Trump Tower servers; that narrative actually came from Trump ally Kash Patel. The Washington Examiner claimed that this all meant there had been spying on Trump's White House office. Charlie Savage of The New York Times disputed these claims and explained that "Mr. Durham's filing never used the word 'infiltrate.' And it never claimed that Mr. Joffe's company was being paid by the Clinton campaign." Sussmann's attorneys  asserted Durham's motion contained falsehoods "intended to further politicize this case, inflame media coverage, and taint the jury pool" as part of a pattern of Durham's behavior since Sussmann's indictment. Durham objected to a motion by Sussmann's attorneys to have the "factual background" section struck from Durham's motion, stating that "If third parties or members of the media have overstated, understated, or otherwise misinterpreted facts contained in the Government’s Motion, that does not in any way undermine the valid reasons for the Government’s inclusion of this information."

Hillary Clinton responded to the right-wing media attacks by hinting at defamation: "It's funny the more trouble Trump gets into the wilder the charges and conspiracy theories about me seem to get. Fox leads the charge with accusations against me, counting on their audience to fall for it again. As an aside, they're getting awfully close to actual malice in their attacks."

Sussmann's attorneys also explained, "Although the Special Counsel implies that in Mr. Sussmann's February 9, 2017 meeting, he provided Agency-2 with (Executive Office of the President) data from after Mr. Trump took office, the Special Counsel is well aware that the data provided to Agency-2 pertained only to the period of time before Mr. Trump took office, when Barack Obama was President," a time period (2015 and 2016) where much investigation of Russian hacks of Democratic Party and White House networks had occurred: "...cybersecurity researchers were 'deeply concerned' to find data suggesting Russian-made YotaPhones were in proximity to the Trump campaign and the White House, so 'prepared a report of their findings, which was subsequently shared with the C.I.A.'"

During a March 2022 court hearing, presiding judge Casey Cooper remarked that Durham's February motion relating to Joffe created a "dustup" that "strikes me as a sideshow in many respects," adding "I don't know why the information is in there." He said the motion, which was ostensibly about a potential conflict of interest matter, could have been quickly resolved in a brief hearing. Cooper then asked Sussmann if he would waive the conflict of interest issue, which Sussmann did, leading Cooper to say, "I didn't need any of that ancillary information to do that." Cooper declined to strike the ancillary information as Sussmann's attorneys had requested, saying he would not ascribe any motives to Durham's motion.

In an April 2022 flurry of late-night court filings by the prosecution and defense prior to the trial beginning the next month, Durham presented a text message Sussmann sent to Baker the night before their meeting which read, "I’m coming on my own — not on behalf of a client or company — want to help the bureau," which appeared to support Durham's allegation that Sussmann had lied to investigators. The New York Times reported that Durham's filings suggested he might introduce at trial the Steele dossier in an effort to suggest a broader conspiracy between Sussmann and the Clinton campaign. Durham's indictment did not mention the dossier, and Sussmann's attorneys argued Durham "should not be permitted to turn Mr. Sussmann’s trial on a narrow false statement charge into a circus full of sideshows that will only fuel partisan fervor." Durham argued that Sussmann's team should not be allowed at trial to suggest any political motivation behind the prosecution. Sussmann's attorneys asked judge Cooper to dismiss the case if Joffe were not granted immunity to provide "critical exculpatory testimony" for Sussmann.

Nine days before the trial, Cooper ruled Durham could not present an argument to the jury that Sussmann was part of a broad "joint venture" involving the Clinton campaign, Fusion GPS, Democratic operatives and various technology researchers. Cooper said allowing such an argument would amount to a "time-consuming and largely unnecessary mini-trial," considering Sussmann had been narrowly charged with lying to investigators rather than conspiracy. Cooper ruled prosecutors could question witnesses about the scope of the DNS analysis, but would not be allowed to introduce evidence that Joffe allegedly had doubts about the accuracy of some of the data. The judge said he was unlikely to allow evidence Joffe may have breached the terms of his employer's government contract, saying it was "at best, only marginally probative of [Sussmann's] supposed motive to lie to the FBI." Cooper did not grant Joffe immunity for his testimony, but said the limits he placed on Durham's lines of questioning might ease his concerns that Joffe could incriminate himself if he were to testify.

Sussmann was acquitted on May 31, 2022. The New York Times reported in January 2023 that two prosecutors on Durham's team had argued to him that the evidence against Sussmann was too thin to pursue charges, and that an acquittal would undermine public faith in Durham's investigation and law enforcement. After Durham pursued the prosecution, one of the prosecutors resigned in protest while another left for another job. Durham's prosecution allowed him to make public large amounts of information insinuating involvement of the Hillary Clinton campaign that were not related to Sussman's prosecution on narrow charges. After the Sussmann prosecution failed, Barr stated it "accomplished something far more important" because it "crystallized the central role played by the Hillary campaign in launching as a dirty trick the whole Russiagate collusion narrative and fanning the flames of it."

Alfa-Bank investigation 

CNN reported later in September that the Durham grand jury had subpoenaed documents from Perkins Coie. CNN had viewed emails between Sussmann and others who were researching the server communications, including Joffe, showing that Durham's indictment of Sussmann cited only portions of the emails. The indictment included an unidentified researcher stating in an email, "The only thing that drive[s] us at this point is that we just do not like [Trump]." CNN's review of other emails indicated the researchers later broadened the scope of their examination for presentation to the FBI. Joffe's attorney asserted the indictment contained cherry-picked information to misrepresent what had transpired. Defense lawyers for the scientists who researched the internet traffic between the Trump Organization and Alfa-Bank said that Durham's indictment is misleading and that their clients stand by their findings.

Acquittal of Igor Danchenko 

In December 2020, Special Counsel John Durham subpoenaed the Brookings Institution for the personnel files of Washington-based Russian analyst Igor Danchenko. In November 2021, Danchenko was arrested in connection with the John Durham investigation and was charged with five counts of making false statements to the FBI on five different occasions (between March 2017 and November 2017) regarding the sources of material he provided for the Steele dossier. This includes Danchenko having allegedly obscured his relationship with Charles Dolan Jr. and having allegedly fabricated contacts with Sergei Millian. Danchenko pleaded not guilty and was released on bail. 

Trump's supporters reacted strongly to these reports of Danchenko's arrest, but conservative columnist and attorney Andrew C. McCarthy described their reactions as "if not irrational, then exaggerated". He provided context when he urged them to be cautious, as Durham's indictments "narrowly allege that the defendants lied to the FBI only about the identity or status of people from whom they were getting information, not about the information itself."

Danchenko's trial began on October 11, 2022. In an order at the beginning of October 2022, the court "excluded from the trial large amounts of information that Mr. Durham had wanted to showcase" as not being evidence for the charges of making false statements. Danchenko was tried on four counts of lying to the FBI about one of his sources and, on October 18, acquitted by the jury on all four. The week before, U.S. District Judge Anthony Trenga acquitted Danchenko of a fifth count, stating that "[t]he prosecution had failed to produce sufficient evidence for that charge to even go to the jury."

Following the trial, the jury deliberated for one day before acquitting Danchenko of the four remaining charges on October 18, 2022. The case represented the second indictment in Durham's probe to go to trial and the second not-guilty verdict.

Durham said Danchenko lied, but the FBI valued him. During the trial, two FBI officials revealed that Danchenko was "an uncommonly valuable" confidential human source for several years whose role went far beyond the Steele dossier:

Aftermath
In January 2023, as Durham was winding down the investigation and drafting a final report, The New York Times published an exposé containing several revelations regarding the investigation. The Times reported that Durham and Nora Dannehy, a longtime Durham aide and his deputy for the investigation, had a series of disputes over Durham's and Barr's prosecutorial ethics. Dannehy unexpectedly resigned from the Justice Department in September 2020 without a public explanation. The Times reported that Dannehy pressed Durham to ask Barr to adhere to DOJ policy by not publicly discussing the ongoing  investigation; as one example, in April 2020 Barr said on Fox News that "the evidence shows that we are not dealing with just mistakes or sloppiness. There is something far more troubling here." Durham declined her request. Months before the 2020 presidential election, Barr asked Durham to prepare an interim report relating to the Clinton campaign and FBI gullibility or willful blindness. After Dannehy learned that other Durham prosecutors had drafted such a report, which she said contained disputed information and should not be released just before an election, she erupted, sent colleagues a memo explaining her concerns, and resigned.

About two weeks after Dannehy left, someone leaked to Fox Business host Maria Bartiromo that no interim report would be released prior to the election. The director of national intelligence, John Ratcliffe, then sought to inject similar information into the campaign by declassifying nearly 1,000 pages of documents for the Durham investigation to use, over the objection of CIA director Gina Haspel. Ratcliffe also wrote to senator Lindsey Graham that the "Russian intelligence analysis" stolen by Dutch intelligence said Clinton had approved a plan to link Trump to Russia. The Times reported that Dutch intelligence was infuriated by release of the information that they had provided with the strictest confidence.

Durham used the intelligence memos that Dutch intelligence had stolen from its Russian counterpart, which some American officials believed to have been seeded with misinformation. The memos contained descriptions of purported conversations among Americans discussing how Hillary Clinton might attempt to frame Trump by linking him to Russian hacking. One such individual was Leonard Benardo, executive vice president of the Open Society Foundation, which was founded by George Soros. The Russian memos claimed that Benardo and Democratic congresswoman Debbie Wasserman Schultz had discussed how then-attorney general Loretta Lynch had purportedly promised to keep the Hillary Clinton email investigation from going too far. Benardo and Schultz denied knowing each other. Durham twice asked federal judge Beryl Howell for an order to seize information about Benardo's emails; Howell denied the request twice, citing the weakness of the Russian memos. Durham then used his grand jury power to demand documents and testimony from the Foundation and from Benardo about his emails. They complied with the demands rather than fight them in court, though the Times reported that line of inquiry appeared to have been a dead end.

The Times reported that by the time he took office, Barr suspected intelligence agencies had played a role in instigating the Crossfire Hurricane investigation. Soon after appointing Durham, Barr summoned to his office National Security Agency director Paul Nakasone to demand his agency cooperate with Durham. He said he believed the NSA's "friends" in the CIA and British intelligence had worked to target the Trump campaign. Durham's team spent its first months looking into this allegation, including by examining CIA files, but found no evidence to support it. Barr and Durham traveled to Britain and Italy to determine if their intelligence agencies had found anything about the Trump campaign and relayed it to the United States, but both countries denied doing so. Top British intelligence officials expressed indignation at the allegation to their American counterparts. Italian officials did, however, tell Barr and Durham that they had evidence linking Trump to certain suspected financial crimes, which the men considered serious enough to open a criminal investigation under Durham's purview, rather than assign it to another prosecutor. No charges were ever filed and it remains unknown how any investigation may have proceeded. In October 2019, multiple press outlets reported Durham had elevated his investigation to criminal status, which the press erroneously assumed was related to the Russia investigation. Barr regularly spoke publicly about the Durham investigation to advance a pro-Trump narrative, but he did not say anything to dispel the erroneous assumption.

Following the Times exposé, senator Dick Durbin, chair of the Senate Judiciary Committee, said his committee would "do its part and take a hard look ... to ensure such abuses of power cannot happen again." Democratic congressmen Ted Lieu and Dan Goldman asked the DOJ inspector general to investigate whether Barr and Durham "violated any laws, DOJ rules or practices, or canons of legal ethics."

References

External links 

 

Russian interference in the 2016 United States elections
Presidency of Donald Trump
United States Department of Justice
2023 in American politics